TrueCaller is a smartphone application that has features of caller-identification, call-blocking, flash-messaging, call-recording (on Android up to version 8), Chat & Voice by using the Internet. It requires users to provide a standard cellular mobile number for registering with the service. The app is available for Android and iOS.

History 
TrueCaller is developed by True Software Scandinavia AB, a privately held company with a head office in Stockholm, Sweden, founded by Alan Mamedi and Nami Zarringhalam in 2009, but most of its employees are in India.

It was initially launched on Symbian and Windows Mobile on 1 July 2009. It was released for Android and Apple iPhone on 23 September 2009, for BlackBerry on 27 February 2012, for Windows Phone on 1 March 2012, and for Nokia Series 40 on 3 September 2012.

As of September 2012, TrueCaller had five million users performing 120 million searches of the telephone number database every month. As of 22 January 2013, TrueCaller reached 10 million users. As of January 2017, TrueCaller had reached 250 million users worldwide. As of 4 February 2020, it crossed 200 million monthly user-base globally, of which 150 million were from India.

On 18 September 2012, TechCrunch announced that OpenOcean, a venture capital fund led by former MySQL and Nokia executives (including Michael Widenius, founder of MySQL), were investing US$1.3 million in TrueCaller to push TrueCaller’s global reach.  TrueCaller said that it intended to use the new funding to expand its footprint in "key markets"—specifically  North America, Asia and the Middle East.

In February 2014, TrueCaller received  in funding from Sequoia Capital, alongside existing investor OpenOcean, TrueCaller chairman Stefan Lennhammer, and an unnamed private investor. It also announced a partnership with Yelp to use Yelp's API data to help identify business numbers when they call a smartphone. In October of the same year, they received  from Niklas Zennström's Atomico investment firm and from Kleiner Perkins Caufield & Byers.

On 7 July 2015, TrueCaller launched its SMS app called TrueMessenger exclusively in India. TrueMessenger enables users to identify the sender of SMS messages. This launch was aimed at increasing the company's user base in India which are the bulk of its active users. TrueMessenger was integrated into the TrueCaller app in April 2017.

In December 2019, TrueCaller announced it plans to go public in an IPO in 2022. TrueCaller has launched the Covid Hospital Directory keeping in mind the increasing cases of corona infection in India. Through this directory, Indian users will get information about the telephone number and address of Covid Hospital.

Security and privacy issues 
On 17 July 2013, TrueCaller servers were allegedly hacked into by the Syrian Electronic Army.    E Hacking News reported the group identified 7 sensitive databases it claimed to have exfiltrated, primarily due to an unmaintained WordPress installation on the servers. Claims made regarding the size of the databases were inconsistent. On 18 July 2013, TrueCaller issued a statement on its blog stating that their website was indeed hacked, but claiming that the attack did not disclose any passwords or credit card information.

In November 2019, India-based security researcher Ehraz Ahmed discovered a security flaw that exposed user data as well as system and location information. TrueCaller confirmed this information and the bug was immediately fixed.

See also 
CallApp
RealCall

References

External links 
 

Mobile software
Android (operating system) software
BlackBerry software
iOS software
Social networking services
Swedish brands
Windows Phone software
Caller ID